Léon Hendrik Jan van Bon (born 28 January 1972) is a retired road racing cyclist from the Netherlands, who won the silver medal in the men's points race at the 1992 Summer Olympics in Barcelona, Spain. He won his first major race at the professionals in 1998, winning the HEW Cyclassics. In 2001 he claimed the overall-victory in the Ronde van Nederland. Van Bon retired in 2013.

Major results

1988
  U17 Pursuit Champion
  U17 Sprint Champion
1989
  U19 Pursuit Champion
  U19 Points Race Champion
  U19 Sprint Champion
1990
  U19 Points Race Champion
  U19 Sprint Champion
  World U19 Points Race Championship
1991
  Amateur Points Race Champion
 2nd, National Time Trial Championship
 2nd, National Amateur Pursuit Championship
1992
  Madison Champion
  Amateur Points Race Champion
 2nd, Olympic Games, Points Race
 2nd, National Amateur Pursuit Championship
 2nd, Overall, Olympia's Tour
 Winner Prologue
1993
 1st, Stages 1 & 7, Tour de l'Avenir
1994
 1st, Tour de la Haute-Sambre
 2nd, National Points Race Championship
1995
 1st, Stage 7, DuPont Tour
 3rd, Overall, PostGirot Open
1996
 1st, Overall, Wien-Rabenstein-Gresten-Wien
 1st, Stage 4, DuPont Tour
 1st, Stage 1, Tirreno–Adriatico
1997
 1st, Omloop der Vlaamse Ardennen
 1st, Amsterdam RAI Derny Race
 1st, Stage 18, Vuelta a España
  UCI Road World Championships, Road race
 9th, Paris–Tours
1998
 1st, HEW Cyclassics
 1st, Stage 9, Tour de France
 2nd, World Cup
 3rd, National Road Race Championship
 4th, Paris–Roubaix
 8th, Clásica de San Sebastián
1999
 1st, Stage 1, Prudential Tour
 6th, Milan–San Remo
 6th, Paris–Roubaix
 6th, Amstel Gold Race
 8th, Paris–Tours
2000
  Dutch National Road Race Championship
 1st, Ronde van Midden-Zeeland
 1st, Stage 6, Tour de France
 7th, Tour of Flanders
 Peperbus Profspektakel
2001
 1st, Overall, Ronde van Nederland
 1st, First Union Invitational
 2nd, Gent–Wevelgem
2002
 1st, Stage 4, Tour de Suisse
2003
 1st, Veenendaal–Veenendaal
 1st, Stage 3, Deutschland Tour
2004
 1st, Stage 3, Paris–Nice
 1st, Stage 5, Ronde van Nederland
 4th, Tour of Flanders
 7th, Paris–Roubaix
 10th, World Cup
2005
  National Road Race Championships
 6th, Paris–Roubaix
 8th, Tour of Flanders
2007
 1st, Nokere Koerse
2012
3rd National Track Championships, Madison (with Geert Jan Jonkman)

See also
 List of Dutch Olympic cyclists

References

External links
  Dutch Olympic Committee

1972 births
Living people
People from Lingewaal
Dutch male cyclists
Cyclists at the 1992 Summer Olympics
Cyclists at the 2000 Summer Olympics
Olympic cyclists of the Netherlands
Olympic silver medalists for the Netherlands
Dutch Tour de France stage winners
Dutch Vuelta a España stage winners
Olympic medalists in cycling
Tour de Suisse stage winners
UCI Road World Championships cyclists for the Netherlands
Cyclists from Gelderland
Medalists at the 1992 Summer Olympics
20th-century Dutch people
21st-century Dutch people